Santa's Slay is a 2005 Christmas slasher black comedy film written and directed by David Steiman, a former assistant to Brett Ratner; Ratner served as a producer. The film stars Bill Goldberg, Douglas Smith, Emilie de Ravin, Robert Culp, Saul Rubinek, Dave Thomas, Rebecca Gayheart, Chris Kattan, and Fran Drescher.

Santa's Slay was released in the United States on December 20, 2005, by Media 8 Entertainment. The film received mixed reviews from critics.

Plot
On Christmas Eve in Alberta, Canada, the Mason family is bickering about their wealth and material possessions while eating Christmas dinner when Santa Claus comes down the chimney and kills them all in various graphic displays of Christmas-themed violence, such as drowning the matriarch Virginia in eggnog, using the star atop a Christmas tree as a shuriken, and stabbing the patriarch's hands to the table with silverware and suffocating him by stuffing a leg of turkey in his mouth.

Riding on his sleigh driven by his "hell-deer", a Buffalo-like beast, Santa arrives at Hell Township and decimates the locals in various holiday-themed ways. In one of his kills, Santa slaughters the occupants of a local strip club. Pastor Timmons, a crooked minister, manages to survive the massacre. Later, Santa murders the local Jewish delicatessen owner Mr. Green using his own menorah.

Meanwhile, teenager Nicholas Yuleson is living with his grandfather, a crackpot inventor who has built a bunker in their basement to survive Christmas. When Nicholas asks Grandpa why he hates Christmas, he is shown "The Book of Klaus", which reveals the origins of Santa Claus. Apparently, Santa was the result of a virgin birth produced by Satan. Christmas was "The Day of Slaying" for Santa until A.D. 1005, when an angel defeated him in a curling match and sentenced him to deliver presents on Christmas for 1,000 years. This means that Santa is free to kill again in 2005.

Upon arriving at the delicatessen, Nicholas is taken to the police station for questioning about Mr. Green's murder. He is bailed out by his love interest, Mary "Mac" Mackenzie, just before Santa arrives and kills all of the officers. Santa pursues Nicholas and Mac in a police car, but they are able to escape, thanks to a shotgun in Mac's truck. They flee to Mr. Yuleson's bunker, with Santa still in pursuit. Nicholas and Mac manage to escape using Grandpa's snowmobile; but Grandpa is run over by Santa's "hell-deer" and killed.

The two teens hide in a local high school, hoping that Santa's powers will end once Christmas ends; but they are eventually forced to confront him in the gym. They are almost killed by Santa on a Zamboni but are saved by Grandpa, who is actually the angel who originally defeated and sentenced Santa. With Christmas over and his powers gone, Santa flees; but his "hell-deer" is shot down by Mac's father with a bazooka. Pastor Timmons is found dead in a Santa suit and is presumed to be the killer, while, in fact, the real killer Santa Claus (using the name Mr. Shatan "referred to Miroslav Šatan") is boarding a flight from Winnipeg to the North Pole. Nicholas notes to Mac that Santa is bound to come back, stating he's finishing what his grandfather started. He and Mac then share a kiss to pursue a relationship.

After the credits, Santa is seen looking over his Naughty List, when he looks into the camera and says "Who's Next?"

Cast
 Douglas Smith as Nicholas Yuleson
 Bill Goldberg as Santa Claus / Mr. Shatan
 Emilie de Ravin as Mary "Mac" McKenzie
 Robert Culp as Grandpa Yuleson 
 Dave Thomas as Pastor Timmons
 Saul Rubinek as Mr. Green
 James Caan as Darren Mason (uncredited)
 Rebecca Gayheart as Gwen Mason
 Chris Kattan as Jason Mason
 Fran Drescher as Virginia Mason
 Alicia Loren as Beth Mason
 Annie Sorell as Taylor Mason
 Donna Zuk as Mrs. Talbot
 Tom 'Tiny' Lister as gas station attendant
 Scott Francis Gibson as the S.W.N.D.S.U. place kicker
 Jimmy Herman as Vinny
 Michael David Simms as Captain/Officer Caulk
 Donald Bland as bouncer
 Kevin Gillese as disgruntled youth
 Ronnie as Santa's Helldeer
 Apache as Santa's Helldeer
 Joan Dunham as random grandmother
 Kendall Garwryluk as random father

Release
Santa's Slay was released on DVD in the United States by Lionsgate on December 20, 2005. It was released in Canada that same day by Maple Pictures. Lionsgate later re-released the film on November 10, 2008.

Reception
Randall Colburn from The A.V. Club gave the film a positive review, calling it "simultaneously vulgar and wholesome, stupid and satirical, violent and lighthearted". Todd Martin of HorrorNews.net also liked the film, writing, "It isn't perfect and there are times when it is a little too corny for its own good but overall it is just a fun, brainless movie that has a ton of violence in it." Brett Gallman from Oh, the Horror wrote, "Admittedly, the film doesn't quite keep up the relentless pace the entire time, but it's mostly one hell of a slay ride, full of cheesy dialogue, colorful characters, and plenty of laughs." David Nusair from ReelFilm Reviews gave the film a mixed 2.5 out of 5 stars, commending the film's humor, pacing, and Goldberg's tongue-in-cheek performance while also stating that the film ran out of steam in the third act.

The film was not without its detractors. Jon Condit from Dread Central was highly critical of the film, awarding it 1.5 out of 5 stars. In his review, Condit criticized the film's writing and direction as being "sloppy" and "amateurish", also criticizing the abrupt ending.

References

External links

 
 
 

2005 comedy horror films
2000s Christmas horror films
2005 films
2005 horror films
American black comedy films
Canadian comedy horror films
American comedy horror films
American slasher films
Canadian Christmas horror films
English-language Canadian films
Canadian slasher films
American Christmas horror films
Slasher comedy films
Films set in 2005
Films shot in Edmonton
Lionsgate films
Santa Claus in film
Demons in film
2005 comedy films
Canadian black comedy films
2000s English-language films
2000s American films
2000s Canadian films